The IIHF Women's Development Cup is an international women's ice hockey tournament. It is governed by the International Ice Hockey Federation (IIHF). It has been established to provide a women's tournament for the non-competing International Ice Hockey Federation (IIHF) countries. The first edition was held in Kuwait City from 6 November to 12 November 2022 with Colombia winning this title.

Results

Medal table

References

External links
Women's Development Cup - nationalteamsoficehockey.com

International Ice Hockey Federation tournaments
Women's ice hockey tournaments
Recurring sporting events established in 2022